The Smith's Snackfood Company is a British-Australian snack food company owned by American multinational corporation PepsiCo. It is best known for its brand of potato crisps. The company was founded by Frank Smith and Jim Viney in the United Kingdom in 1920 as Smiths Potato Crisps Ltd, originally packaging a twist of salt with its crisps in greaseproof paper bags which were sold around London. The dominant brand in the UK until the 1960s when Edinburgh's Golden Wonder took over with Cheese & Onion, Smith’s countered by creating Salt & Vinegar flavour (first tested by their north-east England subsidiary Tudor) which was launched nationally in 1967.

After establishing the product in the UK, Smith set up the company in Australia in 1932. PepsiCo acquired a controlling stake in 1998. Smith's Snackvend Stand is the branch of the company that operates vending machines.

Smiths by country

United Kingdom

Smith's Potato Crisps Ltd. was formed by Frank Smith and Jim Viney in the United Kingdom after World War I. Smith had been a manager for a Smithfield wholesale grocery business which sold potato crisps from 1913. Deciding to make his own, Smith converted garages in Cricklewood, London into a crisp factory, selling to local businesses. By 1920 he had 12 full-time employees. Smith conceived the idea of selling unseasoned potato crisps with a small blue sachet of salt that could be sprinkled over them. In 1927, after buying Jim Viney's share of the business, the company expanded into a factory in Brentford, London. In 1929, Smiths had 7 factories in the UK and the company went public. By 1934, 200 million packets of crisps were sold in Britain each year, 95 percent of which were manufactured by Smith's.

By 1956, the company was making 10 million packets every week. Following the creation of Cheese & Onion flavour by Tayto in Ireland, Golden Wonder (Smiths’ main competitor in Britain) produced their Cheese & Onion version, and Smith’s countered with Salt & Vinegar (tested first by their north-east England subsidiary Tudor) which launched nationally in 1967, starting a two-decade-long flavour war. 

Smith's launched a ‘Do The Crunch’ advertising campaign; in 1967 a young Phil Collins toured the UK teaching people the crunch dance. Aimed at children, Monster Munch were launched by Smiths in Britain in 1977. Originally called "The Prime Monster" (a play on "The Prime Minister", and as part of a wider campaign), they were renamed "Monster Munch" in 1978.

Smiths was later owned by biscuit company Nabisco, BSN and finally sold to American company PepsiCo in the 1990s. Subsequently, Pepsico withdrew the brand, in favour of popular British brand Walkers, which had been heavily marketed in a campaign using former England international footballer turned television presenter Gary Lineker. Many of the products previously owned by Smith's became labelled as Walkers, such as Quavers.

Current Smiths brands include Smiths Crisps, Frazzles, Chipsticks, Snaps and Savoury Selection (Bacon Fries and Scampi Fries).

Australia
After establishing the product and name in the UK, Frank Smith moved to set up a subsidiary in Australia. Smith's Crisps were first manufactured in Australia in 1931 with an associate, George Ensor, in leased premises in Sydney's Surry Hills. They were originally made in 20 gas fired cooking pots, then packed by hand and distributed by Nestle confectionery vans.

Smith's Potato Crisps sold its early crisps in three penny packets, 24 to a tin. "Twist of salt" sachets were included before pre-salting had been introduced. In March 1932, Smith's Potato Crisps Ltd. went into voluntary liquidation as a result of the Great Depression. However, three months later, George Ensor tendered for the business put up for sale by the liquidators, and on 13 May 1932, Smith's Potato Crisps (Australia) was formed with the UK Smith's Company holding a majority interest over minor shareholders. Growth after World War II was rapid, so a continuous cooker process was introduced to replace the individual cooking pots and in 1960 the production of a one shilling pack for cinemas and a box pack for four shillings was initiated.

In 1961, Smith's introduced its first flavoured chip - chicken. It was a very popular flavour, influencing most competitors at the time to adopt a Chicken variation. Other flavours released were Original (Pre-Salted) and Salt & Vinegar. Later, in the 1970s, Barbecue was added as a flavour for Smiths crinkle cut chips, and in the 1980s Cheese & Onion was added. These five flavours - Original Salted (blue packet), Salt & Vinegar (magenta packet), Chicken (green packet), Barbecue (orange packet) and Cheese & Onion (yellow packet) have remained the mainstay flavours of the brand since the 1980s. Many other 'limited edition' variants have also been tried over the years. During the late 1980s, the company introduced the famous advertising mascot Gobbledok, a chip obsessed alien character similar to the popular characters E.T. and ALF. 

In 1968, Associated Products and Distribution Pty Ltd (APD), the food group holding company in British Tobacco Co. (Aust), bought a 41.5% share of Smith's Potato Crisps (Australia)'s parent company, including all Australian shareholders. Over the next 20 years, other takeovers and new products (including Twisties and Burger Rings brands) drove growth. PepsiCo took over the company in 1998. In 1990, the APD name was replaced by CCA Snackfoods.

In 1998, the Smiths Snackfood company was Australia's largest producer of salty snack foods. It was acquired in August of that year, by Frito-Lay the second largest producer of salt snack foods in Australia, which is owned by PepsiCo. To prevent the Australian Competition & Consumer Commission from intervening for unfair trading practices Frito-Lay divested a range of brands, manufacturing facilities, including plants in Western Australia, South Australia, New South Wales and Victoria. The package was named Snack Brands Australia and was sold to Dollar Sweets Holdings. In that package included the brands sold were CC's, Cheezels, Thins and Samboy.

Despite Australians using the term "chips" for crisps, Smith's called their product crisps until as late as 2003. They are now labelled as Smith's Chips. As of 2010–2011, portions contained in "large" bags of Smith's Snackfood products have diminished, down from 200g to 175g (approximately equal to the previous 1975 large size of 6½oz).

Products

Current products

 Burger Rings 
 Bacon Fries  
 Cheetos 
 Chipsticks 
 Cool Pak popcorn
 Crisps (United Kingdom) 
 Doritos 
 Frazzles 
 Funyuns 
 Grain Waves 
 Maxx 
 Nobby's 
 Parker's 
 Red Rock Deli 
 Sakata  
 Scampi Fries 
 Smith's Crinkle Cut 
 Smith's Popped 
 Snaps 
 Lay's Stax 
 Smith's Thinly Cut 
 Toobs 
 Twisties

Previous products

 Bats 
 Battle Tanks 
 Bones 
 Cheese Flavoured Moments 
 Chipsticks 
 Claws 
 Fangs 
 Fighter Planes 
 French Fries 
 Jackets 
 Lay's 
 Monster Munch 
 Quavers 
 Ribs 
 Ruffles 
 Salt 'n' Shake 
 Smith's Selections 
 Squares 
 Sunbites 
 Thins 
 Tubes 
 Twists 
 Twisted 
 Wafflers 
 Zodiacs

See also 
 List of brand name snack foods

Notes

References

Further reading

External links
 

PepsiCo subsidiaries
Snack food manufacturers of Australia
Snack food manufacturers of the United Kingdom
 
Food processing in London
Brand name potato chips and crisps
Walkers (snack foods) brands
Food and drink companies based in Sydney
Food manufacturers of Australia
Manufacturing companies based in Sydney
Australian subsidiaries of foreign companies